Tachycines asynamorus is a cave cricket and the type species of the genus Tachycines (Rhaphidophoridae). In English-speaking countries it is known as the greenhouse camel cricket or greenhouse stone cricket for its propensity for living in greenhouses. It was first described in 1902 by Russian entomologist . Some authorities have placed this species in the genus Diestrammena, but it has now restored to its basonym.

Description
Tachycines asynamorus is a medium-sized, apterous camel cricket. It has very long antennae, palps, and cerci. The female has a long, gently upcurved ovipositor,  in length.

Originating in the caves of eastern Asia, it is omnivorous, sometimes carnivorous, or a scavenger of dead insects and other organic material.

Distribution
It is native to Asia, including Korea, but has long been found especially in heated European greenhouses.

People in the United States were asked to survey their homes for presence or absence of camel crickets such as those of this genus and return photographs and/or specimens to North Carolina State University for further research. Researchers including Rob Dunn have found that introduced greenhouse camel crickets were reported much more commonly than the native North American camel crickets of the genus Ceuthophilus.

References

External links

Rhaphidophoridae
Cave insects
Insects described in 1902
Insects of Korea
Orthoptera of Asia
Orthoptera of Europe